Frenchtown Charter Township is a charter township within Monroe County in the U.S. state of Michigan.  The population was 20,428 at the 2010 census.  

The township is bordered on the south by the city of Monroe.  Sterling State Park and the Enrico Fermi Nuclear Generating Station are located within Frenchtown, and the township was the site of the Battle of Frenchtown during the War of 1812.

Communities
Brest is a former settlement located along the shores of Lake Erie.  It was settled as a port by the French as early as 1810 and named after Brest, France.  In 1836, the Gibralter & Flat Rock Company developed the area of Brest and Gibralter to the north.  The community of Brest had its own post office from July 15, 1836 until July 8, 1863 and again from February 28, 1890 until August 15, 1903.  Gibralter succeeded and later became the city of Gibraltar, but the Brest port failed.  Brest can be seen on a 1911 map of Monroe County in what is now the community of Stony Point.
Loranger is a former settlement within the township.  Settled in 1832, it centered around the Loranger gristmill along Stony Creek.  The community never really developed but did have its own post office briefly from January 16, 1865 until April 26, 1869.  The gristmill was saved and relocated to The Henry Ford in 1928.  The Edward Loranger House, which was built in 1825, remains in its original location along Stony Creek.  
Newport is an unincorporated community centered at  mostly in Berlin Township.  The Newport 48166 ZIP Code serves the northern portion of Frenchtown Township.
Steiner contained its own post office from September 7, 1886 until July 31, 1925.
Stony Creek contained its own post office very briefly from July 6, 1840 until January 18, 1841. 

History

This area was long occupied by Native Americans, including the historic Potawatomi. They had trading relations with French-Canadians in the area. Frenchtown area reflected the ethnicity of its first European settlers: French Canadians took land along the banks of the River Raisin as early as 1784. There had been other French colonial settlements closer to Detroit and on both sides of the Detroit River. Their descendants are known as Muskrat French. Around the same time, the Sandy Creek Settlement was founded near this by Joseph Porlier Benec.  The United States acquired this area, which had been considered part of British Canadian territory after the Treaty of Paris (1783) settling the American Revolutionary War. It was specifically part of state claims (from 1783); the Northwest Territory (1787); Indiana Territory (1803); Michigan Territory (1805); and, finally, the State of Michigan (1837).  

During the War of 1812, the area was the site of the Battle of Frenchtown, in which 397 Americans were killed by the coalition of British Army and Native Americans; this was the highest number of American fatalities of any battle during the war.  The battlefield site today is within the River Raisin National Battlefield Park, which was designated in 2009 and falls within the present-day city limits of Monroe.

In 1817 that portion of Frenchtown was renamed and incorporated as the village of Monroe, named in honor of President James Monroe's planned visit to the Michigan Territory later that year, and burying the history of the original French-Canadian settlers. In the same year, the village of Monroe was named as the county seat of the newly created Monroe County. Monroe was incorporated as a city in 1837.  At that time, the remaining area known as Frenchtown was reorganized as a township, encompassing much of the northern portion of the county: the area from the River Raisin to the Huron River at Wayne County's southern border.  Shortly after, the northern portion of the township was broken off to form Ash Township. Later, by 1867, Berlin Charter Township was formed from other territory of the township. In addition the city of Monroe has annexed pieces of the southern portion of Frenchtown several times. As a result, the boundary between the current Frenchtown Charter Township and the city limits of Monroe is jagged.

Geography

The township is bordered on the east by Lake Erie, and many of the township's communities are located near the lake. Sterling State Park is located along the southern edge of the township and is the only of state park located on Lake Erie. Small pieces of the township are also organized into the Detroit River International Wildlife Refuge. Frenchtown Township is bordered on the south by the city of Monroe, but a small portion of the southern border touches Monroe Charter Township. Raisinville Township is to the west, and Ash and Berlin Township border on the north. A very small portion of the northwest corner of Frenchtown Township touches Exeter Township. The River Raisin serves as the boundary between Frenchtown and the city of Monroe for a short length near Lake Erie and then again further upstream for a small portion near the Custer Airport. Sandy Creek also runs through the township.

Major highways
 runs north through the center of the township with two exits at North Dixie Highway (exit 15) and Nadeau Road (exit 18).
 has its southern terminus within the township at the boundary with Berlin Township.
 runs parallel just west of Interstate 75.
 US 25 is a former highway that ran through the township but was replaced with the present-day U.S. Route 24 and M-125 in the early-1970s.
 runs through the township before its northern terminus at Telegraph Road.
 M-130 (North Custer Road) is a former highway that runs briefly through the southwestern portion of the township.  It was state highway from 1929–1955.

Demographics
As of the census of 2010, there were 20,428 people, 7,733 households, and 5,598 families residing in the township. The racial makeup of the township was 95.51% White, 1.59% African American, 0.41% Native American, 0.53% Asian, 0.01% Pacific Islander, 0.45% from other races, and 1.49% from two or more races. Hispanic or Latino of any race were 2.45% of the population.

There were 7,733 households, out of which 35.9% had children under the age of 18 living with them, 56.1% were married couples living together, 11.0% had a female householder with no husband present, and 27.6% were non-families. 22.4% of all households were made up of individuals, and 8.0% had someone living alone who was 65 years of age or older.  The average household size was 2.65 and the average family size was 3.10.

In the township the population was spread out, with 27.5% under the age of 18, 9.4% from 18 to 24, 31.5% from 25 to 44, 21.5% from 45 to 64, and 10.1% who were 65 years of age or older.  The median age was 34 years. For every 100 females there were 99.9 males.  For every 100 females age 18 and over, there were 95.6 males.

The median income for a household in the township was $47,699, and the median income for a family was $54,032. Males had a median income of $44,338 versus $25,787 for females. The per capita income for the township was $21,335.  About 4.9% of families and 7.0% of the population were below the poverty line, including 6.4% of those under age 18 and 8.7% of those age 65 or over.

Education
Frenchtown Township is served by three separate public school districts.  The majority of the township is served by Jefferson Schools, which has its middle school and high school within the township, as well as one of its two elementary schools.  The northernmost portion of the township is served by Airport Community Schools, while the western portion of the township is served by Monroe Public Schools.

Triumph Academy is a charter school located within the township.

Images

References

Sources

External links

 Frenchtown Charter Township official website

French-Canadian culture in Michigan
French-American culture in Michigan
Townships in Monroe County, Michigan
Charter townships in Michigan
Michigan in the War of 1812
Populated places established in 1784
1784 establishments in the United States
Michigan populated places on Lake Erie